Sara Zabarino (born 1 August 1999) is an Italian female javelin thrower that won gold medal at the 2019 European Throwing Cup at under-23 level with her new personal best, 58.62 m, that is the 10th best world performance of the year and 4th all-time in Italy lists.

Biography
On 10 July 2018 she qualifies for the final of the javelin throw at the 2018 IAAF World U20 Championships in Tampere, with the best measure among the participating athletes. In the final she placed 5th, with a best of 52.98m.

National records
 Javelin throw under-23: 58.62 m –  Šamorín, 10 March 2019

Achievements

Personal bests
Javelin throw: 58.62 m –  Šamorín, 10 March 2019

See also
 Italian all-time lists - Javelin throw

References

External links
 

1999 births
Living people
Italian female javelin throwers
Florida State Seminoles women's track and field athletes